Morant Point in Saint Thomas Parish is the easternmost point of mainland Jamaica and the site of Morant Point Lighthouse.

History

It is called Cape Morante on several early maps including one dated 1572. It has had the name Morant Point since at least 1671.

Climate

See also
List of countries by easternmost point

External links
Aerial view

References

Headlands of Jamaica
Extreme points of Jamaica
Geography of Saint Thomas Parish, Jamaica